The 1930 Arizona gubernatorial election took place on November 4, 1930. George W. P. Hunt narrowly won the general election in 1930, defeating incumbent governor John Calhoun Phillips, who had defeated Hunt in his bid for reelection in the previous election year in 1928.

George W. P. Hunt was sworn in for his seventh, and final, term as governor on January 5, 1931. Although Hunt would run again, this was the last time he won his party's nomination.

Democratic primary
The Democratic primary took place on September 9, 1930. George W. P. Hunt was opposed in the primary by associate justice to the Arizona Supreme Court Frank H. Lyman and Andrew Jackson Bettwy, who was then serving as an Arizona state senator, as well as Fred Cotter. Bettwy would go on to run again for the nomination in four future cycles and would be the nominee of the Arizona Progressive Democrat party in the 1932 general election. Hunt won his party's nomination for the final time in 1930, winning 48.39% of the vote.

Candidates
 George W. P. Hunt, former governor, former ambassador to Siam
 Andrew Jackson Bettwy, Arizona state senator
 Frank H. Lyman, Arizona Supreme Court associate justice
 Fred C. Cotter

Results

General election

References

Bibliography

1930
1930 United States gubernatorial elections
Gubernatorial
November 1930 events